Miguel Cartagena (born July 5, 1992) is a Puerto Rican-American professional boxer.

Amateur career
In 2009, a 16-year-old Cartagena won both the U.S. National Championship and the National Golden Gloves Championship. For his accomplishment, he was awarded the Pride of Philadelphia Award by the Philadelphia Sports Hall of Fame.

Professional career
On March 26, 2011, Cartagena won his pro debut against Omar Gonzalez. The bout was held at the Boardwalk Hall in Atlantic City, New Jersey.

Cartagena fought for the WBC International flyweight title against Galal Yafai on 30 April 2022 on the undercard of the Katie Taylor vs. Amanda Serrano title unification bout. He lost via a second round corner retirement.

References

External links

American people of Puerto Rican descent
Bantamweight boxers
Winners of the United States Championship for amateur boxers
1992 births
Living people
American male boxers
Boxers from Philadelphia